Sara-Lena Caroline Bjälkö (born 23 February 1976) is a Swedish politician and a member of the Sweden Democrats party who has served in the Riksdag since 2014.

Bjälkö worked as a nurse before her political career. She was elected to the Riksdag in 2014 for the Sweden Democrats representing the constituency of Örebro County. She also served as the chairwoman of the SD's local chapter in Falkenberg. In 2018, Bjälkö was involved in an incident in which a bus she was travelling on was shot at by a passing car. Police later determined that the attack was random and not politically motivated.

References 

1976 births
Members of the Riksdag from the Sweden Democrats
Living people
Members of the Riksdag 2014–2018
Members of the Riksdag 2018–2022
Members of the Riksdag 2022–2026
Women members of the Riksdag
Swedish nurses
21st-century Swedish politicians
21st-century Swedish women politicians